The Belize–Guatemala Partial Scope Agreement is a preferential trade agreement between the counties of Belize and Guatemala. Negotiations for the agreement began on November 22, 2004. Both countries signed the agreement on June 26, 2006. Belize ratified the agreement in 2009 and Guatemala ratified it in 2010. The agreement came into effect on April 4, 2010, thirty days after Guatemalan ratification.

References

External links
 "Partial Scope Agreement Between Belize And Guatemala: An Overview" at The Belize Times

2010 in Belize
2010 in Guatemala
Economy of North America
Free trade agreements of Belize
Free trade agreements of Guatemala
Treaties entered into force in 2010